Ceratobasidium is a genus of fungi in the order Cantharellales. Basidiocarps (fruit bodies) are effused and the genus is sometimes grouped among the corticioid fungi, though species also retain features of the heterobasidiomycetes. Anamorphic forms were formerly referred to the genus Ceratorhiza, but this is now considered a synonym of Rhizoctonia. Ceratobasidium species, excluding the type, are also now considered synonymous with Rhizoctonia and some species have been transferred to the latter genus.  Species are saprotrophic, but several are also facultative plant pathogens, causing a number of commercially important crop diseases. Some are also endomycorrhizal associates of orchids.

Taxonomy
The name Ceratobasidium was introduced in 1935 by American mycologist D.P. Rogers to accommodate species of the old form genus Corticium that showed affinities with the heterobasidiomycetes. These affinities were the possession of large sterigmata ("cerato basidium" means "horned basidium") and the production of basidiospores that produce secondary spores.  Four species were originally placed in the genus, with subsequent authors adding a further 35 species. The genus Ceratorhiza was introduced for anamorphs of Ceratobasidium by R.T. Moore in 1987, distinguishing them from anamorphs of Thanatephorus which were retained in Rhizoctonia.

Current status
Molecular research, based on cladistic analysis of DNA sequences, places Ceratobasidium (excluding the type species) within the Cantharellales.

Following changes to the International Code of Nomenclature for algae, fungi, and plants, the practice of giving different names to teleomorph and anamorph forms of the same fungus was discontinued, meaning that Ceratorhiza became a synonym of the earlier name Ceratobasidium. DNA evidence also placed Ceratobasidium species  (excluding the type species) in the genus Rhizoctonia. 

Research on the septal pore ultrastructure of the little-known and atypical type species, Ceratobasidium calosporum, indicates that it is a member of the Auriculariales and is unrelated to other species of Ceratobasidium. This taxonomic problem has not yet been resolved.

Description
Fruit bodies are effused, thin and often inconspicuous, smooth, waxy to dry and web-like, whitish to pale grey. Microscopically they have comparatively wide hyphae without clamp connections and basidia that are spherical to cuboid or broadly club-shaped. Basidia bear 2 to 4 sterigmata, which are comparatively large. Basidiospores are globose to cylindrical (elongated and worm-like in the type species), smooth, and colourless. They frequently produce secondary spores and germinate by hyphal tubes. Asexual anamorphs produce hyphae (sometimes swollen) and occasionally sclerotia (small propagules composed of thick-walled hyphae).

Habitat and distribution
Species are mainly saprotrophic, occurring in the soil and producing fruit bodies on dead stems and plant detritus. Some occur on attached leaves and stems. Several species have been isolated from orchid mycorrhiza. Distribution appears to be cosmopolitan.

Economic importance
Ceratobasidium species are opportunistic parasites of plants, causing a variety of economically important diseases. Examples include: Ceratobasidium cereale, the cause of sharp eyespot of cereals and Ceratobasidium oryzae-sativae, the cause of aggregate sheath spot of rice.

References

Cantharellales
Agaricomycetes genera